KVCR may refer to:

 KVCR (FM), a radio station (91.9 FM) licensed to serve San Bernardino, California, United States
 KVCR-DT, a television station (channel 5, virtual 24) licensed to serve San Bernardino, California